São José (English: Saint Joseph) is a former civil parish (freguesia) in the municipality of Lisbon, Portugal. It was created on November 20, 1567, by Cardinal D. Henrique. At the administrative reorganization of Lisbon on 8 December 2012 it became part of the parish Santo António.

Main sites
Capuchos Convent
São José Church
Tivoli Cinema
Odeon Cinema
Capitólio Theater

References 

Former parishes of Lisbon